The Horten H.XVIII was a proposed German World War II intercontinental bomber, designed by the Horten brothers. The unbuilt H.XVIII represented, in many respects, a scaled-up version of the Horten Ho 229, a prototype jet fighter. The H.XVIII was one of many proposed designs for an Amerikabomber, and would have carried sufficient fuel for transatlantic flights.

Design
In recent years, software modelling has suggested that the stealth and speed of the Hortens' flying wing jet designs would have made interception, prior to bombing, difficult and unlikely.

The ability of bomber crews, in an aircraft such as the Horten H.XVIII, to attack targets in North America, might have been hampered by existing and emerging Allied air defence strategies and technologies, such as:
 increasing air attacks on German factories and airbases;
 intelligence gathering, especially advances in cryptanalysis;
 ongoing improvements in radar (especially early warning and airborne radar), and;
 high-altitude and/or long-range combat air patrols.

Variants

H.XVIIIA
The A model of the H.XVIII was a long, smooth blended wing body. Its six turbojet engines were buried deep in the wing and the exhausts centered on the trailing end. Resembling the Horten Ho 229 flying wing fighter there were many odd features that distinguished this aircraft; the jettisonable landing gear and the wing made of wood and carbon based glue, are but two. The aircraft was first proposed for the Amerika Bomber project and was personally reviewed by Hermann Göring: after review, the Horten brothers (with deep dissatisfaction) were forced to share design and construction of the aircraft with Junkers and Messerschmitt engineers, who wanted to add a single rudder fin as well as suggesting underwing pods to house the engines and landing gear.

H.XVIIIB
The B model of the H.XVIIIB was generally the same as the A model, except the four (down from six) engines and four-wheel retractable landing gear were now housed in underwing pods, and the three-man crew housed under a bubble canopy. The aircraft was to be built in huge concrete hangars and operate off long runways with construction due to start in autumn 1945, but the end of the war came with no progress made. Defensive armament was considered unnecessary due to the expected high performance.

H.XVIIIC/B-2
The C model of the H.XVIII was based on the airframe of the H.XVIIIA with a huge tail. It had an MG 151 turret set in the middle rear of the wing and with six BMW 003 turbojets slung under the wings; this was designed by Messerschmitt and Junkers engineers. It is uncertain if this overall design was directly developed by the Horten brothers or their manufacturer, as there is little surviving evidence of this proposed version. It was eventually rejected by the Horten brothers, as it was not a major improvement over the Ho XVIIIA.

Specifications (H.XVIIIA)

See also

References

Notes

Bibliography

 Horten, Reimar and Peter F. Selinger. Nürflugel (in German). Graz, Germany: H. Wieshaupt Verlag, 1985, pp. 165–167. .
 Mahé, Yann, Tracol, Xavier and Tirone, Laurent. "Wehrmacht 46 : l'arsenal du Reich. Volume 2, Luftwaffe, Kriegsmarine, Waffen-SS, armes nucléaires" (in French). Caraktère editions, Paris, 2018. .
 Myhra, David. The Horten Brothers and Their All-Wing Aircraft. Atglen PA: Schiffer Publishing Ltd., 1998. .

External links
 

1940s German bomber aircraft
Abandoned military aircraft projects of Germany
Flying wings
H18
Quadjets
Six-engined jet aircraft
World War II heavy bombers of Germany
World War II jet aircraft of Germany